Wrapped Coast was a 1969 environmental artwork in which Christo and Jeanne-Claude wrapped a portion of Gadigal country's Little Bay in plastic fabric. It was funded by John Kaldor AO through Kaldor Public Art Projects.

References

General references

 
 
 
 
 
 

1969 works
Works by Christo and Jeanne-Claude
Little Bay, New South Wales